The Supreme Prosecutors' Office of the Republic of Korea (SPO) is a governmental prosecutor organization in South Korea and is run under the Ministry of Justice. As a national representative of prosecutors, the Office works with the Supreme Court of Korea and below.

Organization
It consists of:
Supreme Prosecutors' Office (대검찰청)
High Prosecutors' Office (고등검찰청)
District Prosecutors' Office (지방검찰청)

Controversies
Since the latter half of the year 2010, the ruling political party in South Korea, the Grand National Party, has an uneasy stance with the budget issues and eventually generated severe disputes relating to corruptions and it contributed to criticisms against the Supreme Prosecutors' Office.

Prosecutor general

In 2011, a prosecutor general candidate, Han Sang-dae (한상대) was under investigation for his two incidents of false address registration and his participation of draft-dodging.

Civilian inspections
The Supreme Prosecutors' Office is alleged for hypocritical actions that it poorly managed the investigation of the illegal political-level inspections towards civilian institutions in 2010, however restricted an episode of MBC PD Note about this incident.

Right-wing political policing
The SPO under the Lee Myung-bak government has right-wing political characteristics. There was a series of allegations of sabotages against the current non-partisan mayor, Park Won-soon, by the SPO before the October 2011 election. Politicians who had supported former president Roh Moo-hyun also supported Park Won-soon under a unified intention to oppose the current SPO. The SPO's investigations against Han Myeong-sook has led to more controversy as the Seoul High Court has found her innocent twice in the row. However, the SPO has immediately appealed the decision, citing 11 different counts of evidence. Amongst them were direct statements by Han man-ho that he paid her 900,000,000 won in illegal fund money, Han Myeong-sook's siblings usage 100,000,000 won checks, and 240,000,000 won in Mrs. Han's bank account that had a 'suspicious trail'. The SPO alleges that Han Myeong-sook's assistant was taking the fall to cover for her illegal activities.

Bribery scandal
On January 13, 2012, the Seoul High Court cleared one of the bribery charges against Han Myeong-sook.

Notable incidents

Sexual favor from the suspect

In November 2012, it was alleged a 30-year-old trainee prosecutor, was found to have performed sexual acts in the office with the suspect in her 40s while questioning her over an alleged theft and other charges earlier that month. According to inspectors at the Supreme Public Prosecutors' Office (SPO) four days later, he took the woman to a nearby motel where they had sex. Jae-mong Jeon, the junior prosecutor, also a patent attorney and a graduate of Seoul National University and Hanyang Law School, claims the sex was consensual, according to investigators. The incident has rocked the Korean Prosecutors Office to the core and resulted in a strong reprimand from the president and prompt resignation of the Chief Prosecutor.

G20 summit poster incident

There was an incident where a university instructor, Park Jeong-su, vandalized a G-20 promotional poster by drawing a rat before the 2010 G-20 Seoul summit. His prosecution by the SPO has exposed concerns that the SPO is politically leaned to serve the Lee Myung-bak government.

Impact

Baek Hye-ryun (백혜련), the female district attorney of the Daegu District Public Prosecutor's Office, voluntarily resigned on November 21, 2011 as the SPO cannot officially maintain its political neutrality under the Lee Myung-bak government.

The former chief secretary to late President Roh Moo-hyun, Moon Jae-in suggested that the SPO's resistance against reformations during the previous Participation Government, in which it also succeeded as the spearhead of the right-wing Lee Myung-bak government, eventually contributed to the unjust investigations against Roh in 2009.

Abuse of citizens
On October 26, 2011, the Seoul Central District Court appealed against the SPO for continuing an abusive investigation of a child sex abuse case; demanded the government to compensate the family members of the case in question.

Yoon Seokyeol's resignation
Yoon Suk-Yeol, who was Moon Jae-in the government's second attorney general against major criminal investigation office of the promotion and resigned. He received public attention due to conflicts with the Ministry of Justice, disciplinary action against suspension of work and the court's decision to reject suspension of work. He has topped the presidential survey since his resignation.

Reputation
The 47.1% of South Korean disapproved the Supreme Prosecutors' Office and the credibility was scored low at 4 out of 10, According to the survey conducted in 2009.
Overall general consensus amongst the Korean media rates the Prosecutors' Office of the Republic of Korea as having very low credibility.

Calls for Reform
The power of the prosecutor’s office has been called into question recently with people expressing outrage over the multiple scandals that have occurred within the office and the relationship between the office and business conglomerates. President Moon has drafted prosecution reforms to redistribute some of the power given to the prosecutor's office. The reforms will give back some of the control of criminal investigations to police officers. The point of this would be to distribute the power in the criminal investigations and prevent the prosecutors from acting on behalf of business conglomerates. Another aspect of the reform would be to establish a task force that would investigate high-level corruption.
An issue Moon faced with the implementation of his policies was probing his newly appointed Justice Minister, Cho Kuk in 2019. Cho was given the responsibility of overseeing these reforms. The prosecutor’s office launched an investigation into Cho’s family, specifically looking into his wife and daughter. These investigators found that Cho’s daughter was gaining from her father’s status which is not seen as fraud but only a product of privilege. The pressures from the investigation became too much that Cho eventually stepped down from his position only six weeks later. The fate of these reforms is caught in the balance between the democratic party and the conservatives who have been backing the prosecutor's office. 
President Moon has continued to fight for the implementation of these reforms. In January 2020, Choo Mi-ae became the Justice Minister and worked alongside Moon to limit the prosecutor's office and get the reforms through the legislature.

See also 
 Prosecutor General of South Korea
 Ministry of Justice (South Korea)

References

External links
  Supreme Prosecutors' Office of the Republic of Korea

Government agencies of South Korea
Prosecution